Spinnin' Records is a Dutch electronic music record label founded in 1999 by Eelko van Kooten and Roger de Graaf. In September 2017, Warner Music Group acquired Spinnin' Records for over $100 million.

Background
Van Kooten is the son of former Dutch radio DJ and businessman Willem van Kooten, and initially worked in the publishing business of his father. Together with Roger de Graaf, a former employee of the specialist dance retailer Rhythm Import, van Kooten formed Spinnin' Records in 1999. In the beginning, they concentrated on the pressing of vinyl for artists.

Spinnin' Records hosts 25 active sub-labels alongside their main imprint; the majority linked to a specific artist. The label provides A&R, management, publishing and (digital) marketing for artists they have under contract. The label used to promote songs without naming the artists in order to 'create a buzz'.

Following the acquisition of Spinnin' by Warner Music Group, co-founder van Kooten left the company while de Graaf became the CEO.

Sub-labels

Artists

Awards and nominations

References

External links

 
 
 Spinnin' Records on Spotify
 Spinnin' Records on Apple Music
 Interview with Eelko van Kooten

Dutch record labels
House music record labels
Electronic dance music record labels
IFPI members
Record labels established in 1999
Labels distributed by Warner Music Group
Warner Music labels
1999 establishments in the Netherlands
2017 mergers and acquisitions